Golec uOrkiestra is a Polish folk-rock group, founded in 1998 in the southern village of Milówka near Żywiec by twin brothers Paweł and Łukasz Golec, after whom it is named. At its inception, the group consisted of eight musicians. The band performed mostly during holidays but also in local clubs. In 1999, two more musicians were added, and in March of that year, the first album was recorded in a studio in Bielsko-Biala. In the following years, Golec uOrkiestra recorded several more albums, becoming one of the most popular folk-rock bands in the country. In an address given on June 15, 2001, at Warsaw University, president George W. Bush referenced one of the group's songs, "Sciernisco" saying "Today's own Poland's orchestra called Golec's, is telling the world, "On that wheatfield, I'm gonna build my San Francisco; over that molehill, I'm gonna build my bank."

Personnel 

Łukasz Golec, Paweł Golec, Edyta Golec, Jarosław Zawada, Zbyszek Michałek – Baja, Piotr Kalicki, Robert Szewczuga, Łukasz Plich, Mirosław Hady

Discography

Studio albums

Compilation albums

Christmas albums

Live albums

Soundtracks

Prize and awards
 24 October 2020: the 9th edition of the John Paul II Prize in Bisceglie, Italy, together with the Roman Catholic Apostolic Nuncio Francisco-Javier Lozano Sebastián, Simona amabene, the Italian founder of the Marian family prayer Costola Rosa, the singers Paolo Mengoli, Manuela Villa, Igor Minerva, Daniele Si Nasce, Devis Manoni, Silva Perentin, and the actors Daniela Poggi, Valentina Persia, Luca Capuano and Vincenzo Bocciarelli.

References

External links 

 Official webpage of the band

Polish rock music groups
Polish folk groups
Polish twins